The Island is a 2018 Chinese fantasy comedy film written and directed by Huang Bo. The film stars Huang Bo, Wang Baoqiang, Shu Qi, Lay Zhang, and Yu Hewei. It is the directorial debut film of Huang Bo. The film premiered in China on August 10, 2018.

Plot
Passengers of a sea bus, including brothers Ma Jin (Huang Bo) and Xiao Xing (Lay Zhang), and their colleagues, get stuck in an island and are forced to survive with each other. Meanwhile, Ma Jin and Xiao Xing discover a way to unite the passengers for survival by selling them fishes with playing cards as money, in which Xiao Xing immediately abused his power in and causing brotherly-relationship problems with Ma Jin.

Cast
 Huang Bo as Ma Jin
 Shu Qi as Shanshan
 Lay Zhang as Xiao Xing
 Wang Baoqiang as Xiao Wang
 Yu Hewei as President Zhang
 Wang Xun as Lao Pan (Old Pan)
 Li Qinqin as Sister Qi
 Li Youlin as Professor
 Liu Yanqing as Zhao Tianlong
 Zhang Lei as Lao Yu (Old Yu)
 Hao Wenting as Wen Juan
 Yang Kaidi as Lucy
 Xu Zheng as Passenger
 Guan Hu 
 Liang Jing as Doctor
 Ning Hao
 Teddy Chan
 Fang Xiaohang
 Wei Jiamei
 Sun Zhongqiu

Production
Huang Bo stated that The Island is partly influenced by the 2009 American film 2012 directed by Roland Emmerich. Huang spent over 3 years to write the screenplay. It is Huang Bo's directorial debut. Huang collaborated on the screenplay with no fewer than six writers: Zhang Ji, Guo Junli, Zha Muchun, Cui Siwei, Xing Aina, and Huang Zhanzhong.

Soundtrack

Copyright issue
On August 12, 2018, Yu Mengyuan claimed that the screenplay of The Island bear similarities to her work Men's Crisis.

Release
The Island  premiered in China on August 10, 2018. It grossed 150 million yuan on its first day. The film grossed total of 1,350,000,000 yuan.

Reception
The film was a commercial and critical success, receiving a rating of 7.3 out of 10 from Douban.

Awards and nominations

References

External links
 
 
 

2018 films
2010s fantasy comedy films
Chinese fantasy comedy films
Films set on islands
2018 comedy films
2010s Mandarin-language films